Cache domain containing 1 is a protein in humans that is encoded by the CACHD1 gene.

References

Further reading 

Genes on human chromosome 1